Igors Miglinieks (born 4 May 1964) is a retired Soviet and Latvian professional basketball player and coach. He played at the point guard and shooting guard positions.

Professional club playing career
Miglinieks was a member of the World Basketball League's Erie Wave in 1990. Miglinieks was also a member of the FIBA European Selection team, in 1991.

National team playing career
Miglinieks was a member of the senior Soviet Union national team. With the Soviet Union, he won a gold medal at the 1988 Summer Olympics, becoming the first Latvian basketball player to win the gold medal at the Summer Olympic Games.

Coaching career
After he retired from playing professional basketball, Miglinieks had a long coaching career, working as a head coach in numerous teams and leagues.

Personal life
Miglinieks' brother, Raimonds, was also a professional basketball player.

References

External links
FIBA Player Profile
FIBA Europe Player Profile
BGBasket.com Player and Coach Profile
Olimpiade.lv Profile 
LatvijasSports.lv Profile 

1964 births
Living people
Latvian men's basketball players
Soviet men's basketball players
Latvian basketball coaches
BC Spartak Saint Petersburg coaches
BK VEF Rīga players
Olympic basketball players of the Soviet Union
Olympic basketball players of the Unified Team
Olympic gold medalists for the Soviet Union
Basketball players at the 1988 Summer Olympics
Basketball players at the 1992 Summer Olympics
Point guards
Shooting guards
Basketball players from Riga
Soviet expatriate basketball people in the United States
Latvian expatriate basketball people in Germany
Latvian expatriate basketball people in Russia
Latvian expatriate sportspeople in Switzerland
Latvian expatriate sportspeople in Bulgaria
Latvian expatriate sportspeople in North Macedonia
Olympic medalists in basketball
Latvian sports coaches
Medalists at the 1988 Summer Olympics
PBC CSKA Moscow players
Soviet expatriate basketball people